Denise Imoudu (born 14 December 1995) is a German volleyball player.

Career 
She participated in the 2018 FIVB Volleyball Women's Nations League.

References

External links 

 FIVB profile
 http://www.sc-potsdam.de/volleyball-bundesliga/denise-imoudu-verlaesst-den-sc-potsdam/
 http://www.volleyball-verband.de/de/kader/nationalmannschaft--a-frauen-/spielerinnen--amp--trainer/denise-imoudu/
 https://www.aachener-zeitung.de/sport/volleyball/denise-imoudu-wird-neue-zuspielerin-bei-den-ladies-in-black_aid-24506439

1995 births
Living people
German women's volleyball players
Place of birth missing (living people)